Compo is a census-designated place (CDP) in the town of Westport, Fairfield County, Connecticut, United States. It is in the south-central part of the town, lying between the Saugatuck River and the neighborhood of Saugatuck to the west, and Compo Cove, Sherwood Millpond, and the neighborhood of Greens Farms to the east. The CDP extends south to Compo Beach on Long Island Sound and north to U.S. Route 1 (Post Road). Interstate 95 crosses the middle of the CDP from east to west, with access from either Saugatuck or Greens Farms.

Compo was first listed as a CDP prior to the 2020 census. The Compo–Owenoke Historic District is in the southern part of the CDP.

References 

Census-designated places in Fairfield County, Connecticut
Census-designated places in Connecticut